The 1955 Kansas Jayhawks football team represented the University of Kansas in the Big Seven Conference during the 1955 college football season. In their second season under head coach Chuck Mather, the Jayhawks compiled a 3–6–1 record (1–4–1 against conference opponents), finished tied for fifth in the Big Seven Conference, and were outscored by all opponents by a combined total of 222 to 93. They played their home games at Memorial Stadium in Lawrence, Kansas.

The team's statistical leaders included John Francisco with 459 rushing yards and 24 points scored and Wally Strauch with 498 passing yards. Ralph Moody and Dick Reich were the team captains.

Schedule

References

Kansas
Kansas Jayhawks football seasons
Kansas Jayhawks football